Gerdts is a surname. Notable people with the surname include:

Donna Gerdts, Canadian linguist
Mac Gerdts, German board game designer
 (born 1947), German diplomat
William H. Gerdts (1929–2020), American art historian

See also
Gerdt